"Because of You" is a 1998 song by American vocal group 98 Degrees, released as the second single from their second album, 98 Degrees and Rising (1998). It peaked at number three on the US Billboard Hot 100 and was certified platinum by the Recording Industry Association of America in December 1998. Worldwide, it reached number seven in Canada and also charted in Australia, Germany, the Netherlands, and the United Kingdom.

Music video
The music video, directed by Wayne Isham, takes place in San Francisco. It follows a teenage girl traveling around the city by bus, taxi, and trolley, with the band members appearing on billboards. They are also seen on the beach, in a garden of flowers, and on the Golden Gate Bridge. The video utilizes quick zooming and morphing effects.

Track listings
US CD and cassette single
 "Because of You" (radio edit) – 3:55
 "True to Your Heart" (LP version featuring Stevie Wonder) – 4:15

UK CD single
 "Because of You" (album version) – 4:55
 "Was It Something I Didn't Say" – 5:02
 "Because of You" (Hex Hector Remix radio edit 2) – 3:36
 "Because of You" (Kano Dub) – 7:02

Australasian CD single
 "Because of You" (radio edit) – 3:58
 "True to Your Heart" (LP version featuring Stevie Wonder) – 4:17
 "Because of You" (album version) – 4:56

Charts

Weekly charts

Year-end charts

Certifications

|}

Release history

References

1998 singles
98 Degrees songs
Motown singles
Music videos directed by Wayne Isham
Songs written by Anders Bagge
Songs written by Arnthor Birgisson
Songs written by Christian Karlsson (DJ)